Discocharopa mimosa is a species of air-breathing land snails, terrestrial pulmonate gastropod molluscs in the family Charopidae. This species is endemic to Australia.

References

Gastropods of Australia
Discocharopa
Gastropods described in 1879
Taxonomy articles created by Polbot